The Exportation of Corn Act 1360 (34 Edward III c. 20) was an Act of the Parliament of England passed during the reign of Edward III.

The Act prohibited the exportation of corn to any foreign port except Calais and Gascony. If a corn harvest did not yield a lot of food, it was better for the corn to be used to feed the English rather than be exported.

Notes

Acts of the Parliament of England
1360s in law
1360 in England